Carmen Reid is a Scottish novelist. She is the author of the Secrets of St Jude series of young adult novels set at a girls boarding school in Edinburgh, the Annie Valentine series of novels about a personal shopper, and several other books in the chick lit genre.

Novels

Non-Series Novels
Three in a Bed (2002)
Did The Earth Move? (2003)
How Was It For You? (2004)
Up All Night (2005) 
The Jewels of Manhattan (2011) Corgi Books

Annie Valentine Novels
 The Personal Shopper (2007)
 Late Night Shopping (2008)
 How Not to Shop (2009)
 Celebrity Shopper (2010)
 New York Valentine (2011) Corgi Books

Secrets at St Jude's 
 New Girl (2008)
 Jealous Girl (2009)
 Drama Girl (2010)
 Rebel Girl (2010)
 Sunshine Girl (2011)
 Party Girl (2012)

References

External links
 Carmen Reid web site

Year of birth missing (living people)
Living people
Scottish women novelists
Scottish women writers
20th-century British novelists
20th-century British women writers